Grand Am or Grand-Am can stand for:

Pontiac Grand Am, a nameplate for three different automobiles manufactured by General Motors
Grand-Am Road Racing, an American endurance road racing series